Alberto Felice De Toni (born June 27, 1955) is an Italian professor and engineer. 
Full professor of economic-managerial engineering, he is Scientific Director of CUOA Business School and President of the Steering Committee of Scuola Superiore ad Ordinamento Speciale della Difesa.

Studies and academic career 
After his scientific high school diploma, he graduated magna cum laude in 1980 in Chemical Engineering at the University of Padua. He worked at ENI Ricerche in San Donato Milanese and other industrial groups until 1983, when he enrolled in the first cycle of the PhD in Industrial Innovation Sciences at the University of Padua. He obtained the PhD in 1986 with excellent judgment.

In 1987 he became a Researcher in Economic-Management Engineering at the University of Udine, where he became associate professor in 1992 and full professor in 2000.

At the same University, he was President of the Degree Course in Management Engineering from 2000 to 2006 and Dean of the Faculty of Engineering from 2006 to 2012.

He was Rector of the University of Udine from 2013 to 2019.

From 2015 to 2018 he was Secretary General of the National Conference of Italian University Rectors and from 2019 to 2021 he was President of the CRUI Foundation.

As part of The Magnificent Meetings - promoted by CRUI – held on 29 and 30 June 2017 in Udine, on the occasion of the Conoscenza in Festa event, he organized with the sponsorship of MIUR the G7 University - Education for All. During this event, the representatives of more than 170 universities and organizations from Europe, America and Asia have developed the so-called "Udine G7 University Manifesto".

Other assignments 
At the moment, President of the Independent Evaluation Body of the Istituto Superiore di Sanità, president of the evaluation body of the University of Palermo  and ordinary member of the Academia Europaea.

He has been Vice President of Trieste AREA Science Park from 2002 to 2006 and President of the Agency for Economic Development of the Friuli Venezia Giulia Mountain from 2005 to 2010.

He was President of AIIG - Italian Association of Management Engineering in the statutory two-year period from 2009 to 2011.

In the context of MIUR, he has been President of the National Commission for the Reorganization of Technical and Professional Education from 2007 to 2011.

He was President of the CINECA Evaluation Body from 2018 to 2021.

From 2019 to 2021 he was member of the Strategic Steering Committee of the EUI - European University Institute.

Publications 
The research activity, which resulted in over 380 scientific publications, concerned the field of Management Engineering with particular attention to operations management, innovation management and complexity management. Following a selection of publications:

 De Toni A. F. (2011), International Operations Management. Lessons in Global Business, Routledge - Taylor & Francis Group: London (UK), pp. 288, .
 De Toni A. F., Tonchia S. (1998), Manufacturing flexibility: a literature review, International Journal of Production Research, Vol. 36, n. 6, pp. 1587–1617.
 Battistella C., De Toni A. F., De Zan G. & Pessot E. (2017), Cultivating business model agility through focused capabilities: a multiple case study, Journal of Business Research, Vol. 73, pp. 65–82.
 De Toni A. F., Pessot E. (2020), Investigating organisational learning to master project complexity: An embedded case study , Journal of Business Research, available online.
De Toni A. F., Siagri R. & Battistella C. (2021), Corporate foresight: Anticipating the Future, Revised Edition, Routledge - Taylor & Francis Group: London (UK), pp. 234, .

References 

1955 births
Living people
21st-century Italian engineers
University of Padua alumni
Members of Academia Europaea
Academic staff of the University of Udine
Researchers in organizational studies
Management consultants
People from Padua